The Australian Law Journal is an Australian peer-reviewed law journal which has been publishing since 1927. Studies have found that it is one of the most cited Australian law journals.

A 2002 study found that while on the Federal Court of Australia and the High Court of Australia judges published academic articles most often in the Australian Law Journal in both decades studied, the 1980s and 1990s. The study suffers from the defect that one of the most prolific authors attributed to the Federal Court of Australia (CA Sweeney J) was in fact a barrister son of the judge with the same name and the then Assisitant Editor of the Journal, CA Sweeney QC. 

The first editor "set out to create in the ALJ, a Journal somewhere between the learned reviews and the practical magazines of the English legal profession."

Past editors have included Bernard Sugerman (19271946), Rae Else-Mitchell (19461958), Russell Walter Fox (19581967), Nigel Bowen (19581961), Philip Jeffrey (19681973), Professor JG Starke QC (19741992), and Peter Young AO ((1992–2016)). The Assistant Editor and Revenue Editor (1977–87) was the later Chief Justice of Tuvalu, The Hon Charles Sweeney QC.

Journal rankings 
The Australian Business Deans Council has given this journal a quality rating of "A". The Australian Research Council has ranked this journal in the "B" tier, although the methodology and utility of such rankings has been challenged by Australian legal scholars and the responsible minister has indicated that this ranking system will be discontinued.

References 

Australian law journals
Publications established in 1927
Monthly journals
English-language journals